Monkey Hill is a town in the southeast of the island of Saint Kitts, in Saint Kitts and Nevis.

Geography
The town is the capital of Saint Peter Basseterre Parish.

The landform feature 'Monkey Hill' overlooks the town and is its namesake.

The estimated population of the Monkey Hill area, which includes Upper and Lower Monkey Hill, St. Peter's, Parry's, Ogee's, Stapleton and Bayford's, is approximately 2,654.

Notable people

Atiba Harris is from there and is a local hero.
Kim Collins was born in the town.

Populated places in Saint Kitts and Nevis
Saint Kitts (island)